ATS Euromaster is the British affiliate of the European tyre service provider Euromaster. ATS Euromaster was first established in 1965, and the company now has a network of service centres in the United Kingdom; with centre locations throughout the United Kingdom.

Operations

ATS operates a number of centres equipped for both car and van MOTs and servicing.

References

Retail companies of the United Kingdom
Michelin
Retail companies established in 1965
Companies based in Birmingham, West Midlands
Automotive companies of the United Kingdom
Automotive repair shops
British companies established in 1965
1965 establishments in England